Mill Creek is a small community in the Canadian province of Nova Scotia, located  in Cumberland County.

References
Mill Creek on Destination Nova Scotia

Communities in Cumberland County, Nova Scotia
General Service Areas in Nova Scotia